Charmed Life is the fourth studio album by English rock singer Billy Idol, released on 1 May 1990 by Chrysalis Records.

The lead single, "Cradle of Love", appeared on the soundtrack of The Adventures of Ford Fairlane. The song was famous for its video, which won the 1990 MTV Video Music Award for "Best video from a film". The video directed by David Fincher, involved Betsy Lynn George as a teenager who knocks at her neighbour's door and asks to play a tape, before stripping to the music. The album's second single is a cover version of "L.A. Woman" by The Doors. Its video was also directed by Fincher. The third single off the album was "Prodigal Blues".

Charmed Life was certified Platinum by the RIAA and Silver by BPI in 1990.

Background

Unlike Idol's previous two albums, Charmed Life did not feature guitarist Steve Stevens, and most of the guitar work was handled by Mark Younger-Smith instead. Idol told Sounds in 1990, "Meeting Mark Younger-Smith gave me a lynchpin, someone I could work with by forming a sound and an idea for this album." Idol finished sessions for the album on 5 February 1990. During the following morning, after picking up the final mixes from Conway Studios, he was seriously injured in a motorcycle accident.

"Love Unchained" was inspired by a friend of Idol's who died in a motorcycle accident.

Track listing

Personnel 
 Billy Idol – vocals, acoustic guitar (3, 7), arrangements, horn arrangements (11)
 Greg Mathieson – keyboards (1)
 John Philip Shenale – programming (2), additional bass (2)
 Arthur Barrow – keyboards (3, 4, 6-9), programming (6, 11), additional bass (6), bass (8, 11)
 Mark Younger-Smith – guitars, bass (2)
 Jimmy Johnson – bass (1)
 Phil Soussan – bass (3, 10), additional bass (11)
 Vito – bass (4, 5, 6, 9)
 Randy Jackson – bass (7)
 Keith Forsey – drums (1, 2, 3, 5-9), percussion (11), arrangements
 Mike Baird – drums (3, 4, 10, 11), programming (11), drum programming (11)
 Alex Brown – backing vocals (3, 5)
 Bunny Hull – backing vocals (3, 5)
 Stephanie Spruill – backing vocals (3, 5)
 The P.L.S. Singers – backing vocals (11)

Handclaps on "The Right Way"
 The "Rude Dudes" (John Diaz, Keith Forsey, Billy Idol, Art Natoli and Mark Younger-Smith)

Production 
 Keith Forsey – producer 
 Jeff Aldrich – A&R 
 Brigid Waters – A&R
 Tommy Vicari – mixing, engineer (1, 6, 8, 9)
 Dave Concors – engineer (2-5, 7, 10, 11)
 Kevin Becka – assistant engineer (1)
 Bryan Carlstrom – assistant engineer (2, 3, 5, 7, 10, 11)
 Ken Paulakovich – second engineer (5)
 Ian Minns – assistant engineer (6)
 Craig Porteils – mix assistant (1, 6), assistant engineer (6)
 Paul Wertheimer – mix assistant (2, 10)
 Bryant Arnett – mix assistant (3, 4, 5, 7, 8, 9, 11), assistant engineer (4, 6, 8, 9)
 Bernie Grundman – mastering (1-5, 7-11)
 George Marino – mastering (6)
 AWest – art direction, cover design, cover illustration 
 Brass Ring Circus Studio – art direction
 Billy Idol – cover design
 Max Aguilera-Hellweg – photography 
 Art Natoli – personal assistant 
 Eric Barrett – management
 Tony Dimitriades – management

Studios
 Recorded at Lighthouse Studios (Los Angeles, California); Track Record Studios and Oasis Recording Studios (North Hollywood, California ); Conway Studios (Hollywood, California).
 Mixed at Record Plant (Los Angeles, California) and Conway Studios
 Tracks 1-5 & 7-11 mastered at Bernie Grundman Mastering (Hollywood, California).
 Track 6 mastered at Sterling Sound (New York City, New York).

Charts

Weekly charts

Year-end charts

Certifications

References

Billy Idol albums
1990 albums
Albums produced by Keith Forsey
Chrysalis Records albums